The CS Indic character set, or the Classical Sanskrit Indic Character Set, is used by LaTeX represent text used in the Romanization of Sanskrit. It is used in fonts, and is based on Code Page 437. Extended versions are the CSX Indic character set and the CSX+ Indic character set.

Code page layout

History 
The CS and CSX character set was defined during an informal discussion over a beer between John Smith, Dominik Wujastyk and Ronald E. Emmerick during the World Sanskrit Conference in Vienna, 1990. A few months later they were endorsed by several other Indologists including Harry Falk, Richard Lariviere, G. Jan Meulenbeld, Hideaki Nakatani, Muneo Tokunaga, and Michio Yano.

References

Character encoding
Character sets